This is a list of MPs that lost their seat at the 1993 Canadian federal election. In total 132 MPs were defeated for re-election, many by the recently founded Bloc Québécois and the Reform Party.

Breakdown

Progressive Conservative

New Democrat

Independent

Notes

See also 

1993 Canadian federal election
Lists of Canadian MPs who were defeated by election